Puya may refer to:
 Puya (plant), in the family Bromeliaceae
 Puya (river), in Russia
 Puya, a variety of Guajillo chili
 Puya (Meitei texts), traditional or mythological texts of the Meetei people
 Culoepuya or Culo'e Puya, Venezuelan drums of Congolese origin
 Puya (band), a progressive metal band from Puerto Rico
 Puya (album), a 1995 album by the band
 Puya, a Romanian rapper from the hip-hop, rap group La Familia